Isaac Habrecht II (1589–1633) was a professor of astronomy and mathematics in Strasbourg. He was also a doctor of medicine and philosophy.

Uranography 
Isaac Habrecht II made a celestial globe and a couple of celestial planispheres. He introduced some constellations that were created by a Dutch cartographer, Plancius, and he invented now the obsolete constellation Rhombus. It followed by a French cartographer Royer. Later, it was turned into le Reticule Romboide (now Reticulum) by a French astronomer, de Lacaille.

Family 
 Isaac Habrecht I: his father, a horologist.
 Isaac Habrecht III: his nephew, a clockmaker.

See also 
 Uranography

Notes

References 
 Warner, D. J. (1979). Sky Explored: Celestial Cartography 1500–1800. New York: Alan R. Liss; Amsterdam: Theatrum Orbis Terrum. pp. 104–105.

17th-century German astronomers
1589 births
1633 deaths